Testa del Rutor or Tête du Ruitor (3,486m) is a mountain of the Graian Alps in Aosta Valley, north-western Italy. It is the highest summit of the Rutor-Léchaud Group, lying roughly between the Mont Blanc Massif and the Vanoise Massif. The huge Glacier del Rutor lies on its slopes. The mountain is rarely climbed except by Italy's mountain troops, the Alpini, who use it for training.

References

Mountains of the Alps
Alpine three-thousanders
Mountains of Aosta Valley